Ivanics is a Hungarian surname, cognate to South Slavic Ivanić. Notable people with the surname include:

 Dóra Ivanics (born 1994), Hungarian handballer
 Ferenc Ivanics
 Gergely Ivanics (born 1978), Hungarian cyclist

Hungarian-language surnames